Windesheim Honours College (Zwolle, Netherlands) is an initiative of Windesheim University of Applied Sciences and VU University Amsterdam. The college offers an international and English-language Bachelor's degree programme, for students who aspire a future career as international project managers or consultants.

Two Specializations
Windesheim Honours College offers two specializations with an international orientation and a specific focus on sustainable development:
 Public Health
 Communication & Media

Campus
Windesheim Honours College is a residential college in the city centre of Zwolle.

Windesheim University of Applied Sciences
Windesheim Honours College is part of Windesheim University of Applied Sciences.

Vocational universities in the Netherlands
Business schools in the Netherlands
Education in Overijssel
Buildings and structures in Zwolle